Amdhan Ali (born 11 September 1992), known as Andy is a Maldivian international footballer who plays as a defender for Maldivian club Maziya.

International career
Amdhan made his debut in an international friendly against Laos on 13 May 2014, in which he played the full 90 minutes and Maldives went on to win the game by a 7–1 score.

External links

References

1992 births
Living people
Maldivian footballers
Association football defenders
Maldives international footballers
Footballers at the 2014 Asian Games
Asian Games competitors for the Maldives
Club Eagles players